Le Combat dans l'île (The Fight on the Island) is a 1962 French drama film directed by Alain Cavalier that stars Jean-Louis Trintignant, Romy Schneider, and Henri Serre. Set in the context of the campaign of bombings and assassinations by the Organisation de l'armée secrète, it tells the story of an austere young man who is corrupted by the lure of terrorism and of his more sympathetic wife, who finds both independence and a more worthwhile partner.

Plot
Clément, reserved son of a wealthy industrialist in Paris, has joined a far-right terrorist organisation. His ebullient wife Anne, formerly a popular actress, knows nothing of it until she finds a disassembled bazooka in their bedroom. One night, under orders from an associate named Serge, Clément uses the bazooka to destroy the apartment of a popular socialist politician. The media report that the politician died in the explosion and, ringing from the airport, Serge tells Clément to disappear.

He takes refuge with Anne in an isolated watermill belonging to Paul, an old school friend who now runs a socialist printing press. The media then report that the politician was not in his apartment and that the rocket obliterated a dummy. Clément realises that Serge set him up and, determined to kill him in revenge, sets off to hunt him down. Left in the watermill, Anne grows closer to the amiable Paul, who is attracted to her but reluctant to take advantage of his old friend. He encourages her to emerge from her loneliness and to go back to work as an actress. As months pass and Clément does not return, the two eventually become lovers and Anne falls pregnant.

Then Clément reappears from South America, having found and killed his opponent there with the help of local Nazis. With some right-wing thugs he beats Paul up and leaves him a pistol, saying that he will contact him to settle things in a man-to-man shoot-out. One day at the watermill, Clément calls to Paul from a wooded island opposite, telling him to bring the pistol and fight. Though Anne is terrified, Paul has military skills learned from the war in Algeria and outwits his opponent. He and Anne can start a new life together.

Cast
 Romy Schneider : Anne 
 Jean-Louis Trintignant : Clément 
 Henri Serre : Paul
 Pierre Asso : Serge
 Diane Lepvrier : Cécile
 Jacques Berlioz : Clément's father

Reception
Though overshadowed at the time of its release, the film has since gained respect. A recent American review commented:

References

External links

1962 films
French drama films
1960s French-language films
Films directed by Alain Cavalier
1962 drama films
Films about terrorism
1960s French films
Fiction about the Organisation armée secrète